The Quakers and Moravians Act 1838 (1 & 2 Vict. c. 77) was an Act of Parliament of the United Kingdom, signed into law on 10 August 1838. Prior to this Act, Quakers and Moravians had been able to give an affirmation in lieu of an oath where one was required; for example, when giving evidence in court. This Act extended that privilege to those who were previously members of these groups and had seceded from them, retaining the conscientious objection to oaths. Any person choosing to make an affirmation under this Act was required to give a declaration to that extent, and would remain subject to the normal penalties of perjury for falsehood.

References
The British almanac of the Society for the Diffusion of Useful Knowledge, for the year 1839. The Society for the Diffusion of Useful Knowledge, London, 1839.

External links 
 Full text as enacted, as adopted by the Republic of Ireland
 Full text as enacted, as adopted by the state of Western Australia (page 117)

1838 in British law
United Kingdom Acts of Parliament 1838
History of the British Province of the Moravian Church
Christianity and law in the 19th century
History of Quakerism
Quakerism in the United Kingdom
Law about religion in the United Kingdom